Pyrrhopoda is a genus of flower chafers, a group of scarab beetles, comprising the subfamily Cetoniinae. Species are found in East Africa.

References

External links 
 

 
 Pyrrhopoda at insectoid.info

Scarabaeidae genera
Cetoniinae